Augustas Marčiulionis (born 21 March 2002) is a Lithuanian basketball player who currently plays for NCAA Division I Saint Mary's College after having played for Rytas Vilnius of the Lithuanian Basketball League (LKL). Standing , he plays the point guard position.

Professional career 
Marčiulionis made his professional career debut with BC Perlas in the 2018–19 season. On 23 June 2020, Marčiulionis stayed with the Rytas Vilnius. On 19 September 2020, Marčiulionis, as a member of the Rytas Vilnius, debuted in the Lithuanian Basketball League and contributed to a 106–77 season opening victory versus the Juventus Utena. However, he played under amateur contracts for both Perlas and Rytas to preserve his eligibility to play NCAA basketball.

US college career 
On 16 June 2021, Marčiulionis signed a letter of intent to play at Saint Mary's.

National team career 
In 2020, Marčiulionis was invited to play for the senior Lithuania men's national basketball team during the EuroBasket 2022 qualification on 27–29 November. He had previously played for Lithuania's U16 and U18 national teams, and is scheduled to play for Lithuania at the 2021 FIBA U19 World Cup.

Personal life 
Augustas is the son of Hall of Fame player Šarūnas Marčiulionis.

References 

2002 births
Living people
BC Rytas players
Point guards
Basketball players from Vilnius
Saint Mary's Gaels men's basketball players